The 2016–17 Welsh Alliance League, known as the Lock Stock Welsh Alliance League for sponsorship reasons, is the 33rd season of the Welsh Alliance League, which consists of two divisions: the third and fourth levels of the Welsh football pyramid.

There are fourteen teams in Division 1 and sixteen teams in Division 2, with the champions of Division 1 promoted to the Cymru Alliance and the bottom team relegated to Division 2. In Division 2, the champions and runners-up are promoted to Division 1.

The season began on 12 August 2016 and concluded on 13 May 2017 with Glantraeth as Division 1 champions and Glan Conwy were relegated to Division 2. In Division 2, Llandudno Albion were champions with Mynydd Llandegai as runners-up. Both teams were promoted to Division 1.

Division 1

Teams
Trearddur Bay were defending champions from the previous season. Greenfield and Nantlle Vale, who were Division 2 champions and runners-up, respectively from the previous season were promoted to Division 1.

Grounds and locations

League table

Results

Division 2

Teams
Greenfield were champions in the previous season and were promoted to Division 1 along with runners-up, Nantlle Vale. They were replaced by Llanfairpwll who were relegated from Division 1.

Gwynedd League champions, Y Felinheli and third place, Cemaes Bay were promoted to Division 2.

Grounds and locations

League table

Results

References

Welsh Alliance League seasons
2016–17 in Welsh football